The Rugby Championship is an international rugby union competition contested annually by Argentina, Australia, New Zealand, and South Africa. These are the four highest ranked national teams in the Southern Hemisphere; the Six Nations is a similar tournament in the Northern Hemisphere.

Prior to the 2012 tournament, when Argentina joined, it was known as the Tri Nations. The Tri Nations name was temporarily revived for the 2020 tournament due to the withdrawal of South Africa owing to the COVID-19 pandemic.

The competition is administered by SANZAAR, a consortium consisting of four national governing bodies: the South African Rugby Union, New Zealand Rugby Union, Rugby Australia and the Argentine Rugby Union. The inaugural Tri Nations tournament was in 1996, and was won by New Zealand. South Africa won their first title in 1998, and Australia their first in 2000. Following the last Tri Nations tournament in 2011, New Zealand had won ten championships, with South Africa and Australia on three titles each. The first Rugby Championship was won by New Zealand, who won all six of their matches.

New Zealand, South Africa and Australia have frequently been ranked among the top rugby nations. New Zealand and South Africa have each won the Rugby World Cup three times, and Australia twice, accounting for eight of the nine Cups.

History

Foundation
Australia and New Zealand first played each other in 1903. South Africa toured both nations in 1921 but there was never any formal competition between these teams, unlike the Home Nations (now known as the Six Nations Championship) in the Northern Hemisphere and the three nations only met sporadically.

In the 1930s, Australia and New Zealand started contesting the Bledisloe Cup during rugby tours between the two countries.

The final acceptance of professionalism in rugby union launched the Tri Nations concept - nearing the completion of the 1995 Rugby World Cup, multimillion-pound negotiations between the South African, New Zealand and Australian unions took place to form SANZAR. The new union soon announced a ten-year deal worth £360 million. The competition was established to create an equivalent to the Five Nations in Europe.

In 2012, this competition was extended to include Argentina, a country whose impressive performances in international games (especially in reaching the third place in the 2007 Rugby World Cup) was deemed to merit inclusion in the competition. As a result of the expansion to four teams, the tournament was renamed The Rugby Championship.

Format
The series is played on a home-and-away basis. From the first tournament in 1996 until 2005, the three teams played each other twice. Since then, each team has played the others three times, except in the Rugby World Cup years of 2007 and 2011 when the series reverted to a double round-robin. For 2015, to provide the teams longer preparation time ahead of the 2015 Rugby World Cup, each side played the others' teams only once each. This format was also adopted for the 2019 Tournament.

With the addition of Argentina, in 2012, the format once again reverted to a double round-robin.

Related competitions
In addition to the Rugby Championship trophy, the winner of games played between Australia and New Zealand also go toward determining the winner of the Bledisloe Cup each year.  Similarly, the Freedom Cup is contested between New Zealand and South Africa, the Mandela Challenge Plate between Australia and South Africa, and the Puma Trophy between Australia and Argentina.

Tri Nations

The opening tournament of 1996 was dominated by the All Blacks who stormed to victory undefeated, leaving the Springboks and the Wallabies with just one win each — against each other. The opening exchange was between New Zealand and Australia, New Zealand winning by over 40 points and, although they won all four of their games, the later matches were a lot closer in their scorelines. The launch of the Tri Nations was considered a huge success.

A similar story unfolded the following year, 1997. The All Blacks maintained their dominance over the new competition and again went undefeated. Australia and South Africa found themselves in similar position again with just one win each. The 1998 series was something of a turnaround for all nations with South Africa winning the tournament and Australia finishing second. Two-time winner New Zealand finished at the bottom with no wins. In the following tournament in 1999 New Zealand again became Tri Nations champions and defending champions South Africa fell to the bottom.

Australia, the World Champions at the time, won their first Tri Nations championship in 2000. That tournament is also notable for Australia's opening match against New Zealand at Stadium Australia where 109,874 spectators attended. Jonah Lomu scored a try in injury time to grab the win for the All Blacks. The game was hailed as one of the greatest ever, and the end competition thought by some to be the best Tri Nations ever at the time.

Australia continued their reign as Tri Nations champions by successfully defending the trophy the following year. Their run ended in 2002 when the All Blacks won the championship again. New Zealand successfully defended it in 2003. South Africa won the 2004 tournament where the three nations finished with two wins each. The Springboks emerged as winners due to their superior table points. The trophy returned to New Zealand in 2005 and the Wallabies failed to win a game. In 2006 New Zealand retained the trophy with 2 games still to be played. In 2007, the Tri Nations was shortened to two games against either team, because it clashed with the Rugby World Cup in France. The Tri Nations championship and the Bledisloe Cup came down to the final match, between New Zealand and Australia at Eden Park. New Zealand ran out easy winners, and lifted both the trophies. There was some controversy as South Africa fielded less than a full strength squad in the away legs in Australia and New Zealand in anticipation of the World Cup. New Zealand defended their title in 2008, in beating Australia in the final match in Brisbane. In 2009, South Africa claimed the season crown in their final match with an away win over New Zealand in Hamilton. 2010 saw another dominant performance by New Zealand, winning the tournament with 2 games to spare and all 6 of their games.

On 5 December 2020 , a traditional version of the Australian National Anthem was sung for the first time in the Eora indigenous language, before the match between the Argentinian Pumas and the Australian Wallabies.

Expansion
The competition was expanded in 2006 and saw each of the three nations play each other three times, although the 2007 series reverted to a double round-robin to reduce fixture congestion in a World Cup year. Historically there were persistent rumours about the inclusion of Argentina and this was formalised on 14 September 2009 when it was announced that Argentina would become part of the competition in 2012. There have also been rumours about a Pacific Islands team being included too.

Until then, Argentina was the only tier 1 nation that had no regular competition, and some, among them former Pumas captain Agustín Pichot, had even spoken of them joining the Six Nations. However, a spokesperson said: "We belong in a tournament in the southern hemisphere and not in an expanded Six Nations". The inclusion of Argentina did have some support from some bodies, South African Rugby Union deputy chief executive saying: "We would support (their) request to play in the Tri-Nations". Former Springbok coach Jake White also said: "I think it would add a new dimension to the tournament and perhaps refresh it."

Since 2007 a deal between the International Rugby Board (IRB), the world governing body for the sport, was brokering a deal with SANZAR to admit Argentina to the Tri Nations as early as 2008 The Sunday Times reported that many players and fans in the SANZAR countries disliked the expansion to a triple round-robin, noting that former All Blacks scrum-half Justin Marshall accused SANZAR of overkill in 2006. Also, the piece added that South Africa is highly dissatisfied with the current Tri Nations format, as it requires that the Boks tour for a month while the Wallabies and All Blacks fly in and out of South Africa in a week. The addition of Argentina would even out travel commitments for all teams involved. The Sunday Times noted that there were two main stumbling blocks to adding Argentina:
 Division of broadcast revenue, which is currently shared equally by the four SANZAAR countries.
 At the time, the biggest stumbling block was possibly the Argentine Rugby Union (UAR). The Times noted that some UAR members were "deeply attached to amateurism", adding that the IRB had a blueprint on the table for a South American provincial competition similar to SANZAR's Super Rugby, featuring six Argentine provincial sides and one each from Uruguay and Chile, but UAR had yet to approve it.

However, by August 2007, it became clear that there would be no expansion of the series before the current television contract between SANZAR and News Corporation expires in 2010. An IRB spokesman stated that the main problems with adding the Pumas to the Tri Nations, besides media contracts, were fixture congestion and the lack of a professional structure in Argentina. Domestic rugby in Argentina is still amateur; in fact, the UAR constitution specifically prohibited professional rugby in the country until December 2007, and even did not allow for a professional league. Because of this, a large majority of the Pumas play for European club teams, which would likely create further scheduling conflicts. Admission of Argentina was therefore submitted to several conditions for the UAR:

 Ensure its best players would be available at the Tri-nations time of year, late summer, which is exactly when France's Top 14 and England's Premiership start their first games.
 Develop professional rugby inside Argentina thanks to a SANZAR loan and financial support from the IRB; Professionalisation has since entered Argentina.
 Reform competitions into a single united professional league. There are now regional leagues being the one from Buenos Aires city the strongest and a short 4-team clubs national championship.

In November 2007, the IRB held a conference on the future worldwide growth of the sport, with the status of Los Pumas a key topic of discussion. The most important decision made at the conference, with regard to the Tri Nations, was the agreement of the UAR to establish a professional rugby structure between 2008 and 2012, at which time Argentina would be "fully integrated into the Southern top-flight Rugby playing structure." At the time of the IRB conference, the UAR had already scheduled a special meeting for 28 December 2007 to amend its constitution to allow players to be paid. Shortly after the IRB conference, New Zealand Rugby Union deputy chief executive Steve Tew expressed doubts that, within ten years, a professional domestic competition in Argentina would be sufficiently viable to retain elite players in South America despite all the good intentions and funding of the IRB. The aforementioned UAR meeting did not result in the formation of a professional league. The 23 provincial delegates voted unanimously to keep their domestic league amateur, but approved a plan to centrally contract the Pumas selection pool to the UAR as professionals. In February 2009, the UAR announced that under a plan supervised and financed by the IRB, it had contracted 31 local players, who will each receive 2,300 Argentine pesos (US$655/GBP 452) per month. The eventual goal is for these players to form the core of a future Pumas selection pool.

Argentina officially joined The Rugby Championship in a meeting in Buenos Aires on 23 November 2011.

Japan have been in talks with joining the competition as they seek to face better opponents. They previously played in the Asia Rugby Championship which they dominated in for many years, despite facing lower competition. Fiji to a lesser degree have also been mentioned as another potential candidate to join the competition. Along with Fiji, Samoa and Tonga, other smaller potentials to join, compete in the annual World Rugby Pacific Nations Cup.

Competition

The order of fixtures has changed several times in the history of the series. In the past each team played the others twice. After some tweaking of the schedule it was decided to start the series with two fixtures in either South Africa or New Zealand and move the series to the country that did not host the opening rounds. Under this setup Australia's home fixtures were always the middle two in the series.

The recent reworking of the calendar took effect with the 2006 event. This was the result of a new television deal between SANZAR and broadcasters in the United Kingdom and the SANZAR countries. Each team plays the other three times. In 2006 the series opened in New Zealand and the first four rounds alternated between New Zealand and Australia. The fifth round was in Australia. After a one-week break the series returned to New Zealand and then finished with South Africa's three home fixtures. Each team has two home fixtures against one team and only one home fixture against the other.

The competition begins in July. Originally it had started late in July but, with the expansion of the series, the start date has moved to early in the month. It typically ends early in September. The Rugby Championship opens after the completion of the Super Rugby competition for the year because players from the SANZAR countries are involved in both.

The winner is determined by a points system:
4 points for a win
2 points for a draw
0 points for a loss

"Bonus points" may also be earned in any given match and count toward deciding the series winner. A total of two bonus points can be possibly scored:
The Attacking bonus point. Prior to 2016, a team could gain an attacking bonus point by scoring four or more tries in the match, regardless of the final result. From the 2016 competition onwards, this was modified so that an attacking bonus point is awarded if a team scores at least three tries more than their opponents.
The Defending bonus point by losing by seven points (a converted try) or fewer.

A victorious team can collect either 4 or 5 points, depending on whether or not it gained an attacking bonus point. A team that draws can collect either 2 or 3 points, depending on whether or not it gained an attacking bonus point. A losing team may collect from 0 to 2 points. At the end of the series the team with the most points is declared the winner.

If teams end level on points for any position, the first tiebreaker is total number of wins in the competition, then number of wins against the other team/s tied on  points, then overall points differential, then points differential between the team/s tied on points, then most tries scored in the competition. If that can't differentiate the team, the series or position will be shared.

However, the Rugby Championship has yet to finish in a tie for the top spot.

Results
Main article: Tri Nations and Rugby Championship champions

Tri-Nations (1996–2011; 2020)

The Rugby Championship (2012–Present)

Overall titles (since 1996)

Notes:
 The 1996–2011 results were for the Tri Nations; the results from 2012 to the present are for the Rugby Championship.
 Teams played only four matches in 2007 and 2011, and three in 2015 and 2019, due to the Rugby World Cup.
 In 2020, the Tri Nations was contested between Argentina, Australia, and New Zealand. Due to COVID-19, South Africa did not participate.

Attendance

Top scorers
The following sections contain points and tries which have been scored in The Rugby Championship.

Top points scorers

Updated: 24 September 2022  Source: espnscrum.com

Top try scorers

Updated: 24 September 2022  Source: espnscrum.com

Broadcasting rights
In Australia, the Rugby Championship is broadcast on the Nine Network and Stan. Nine airs Wallabies matches free-to-air while Stan broadcasts all matches. The competition was formerly broadcast by Fox Sports until 2020. Sky Sport airs the competition in New Zealand. Setanta Sports broadcast live matches of The Rugby Championship in Asia. Sky Sports shows all games live in the UK and Ireland, while ESPN holds the rights in the Americas, airing matches in Argentina on ESPN Latin America and in North America on its WatchESPN streaming service.

See also

 History of rugby union matches between Argentina and Australia
 History of rugby union matches between Argentina and New Zealand
 History of rugby union matches between Argentina and South Africa
 History of rugby union matches between Australia and New Zealand
 History of rugby union matches between Australia and South Africa
 History of rugby union matches between New Zealand and South Africa
 Rugby union trophies and awards
 Six Nations Championship, an analogous tournament of national teams in the Northern Hemisphere

References

External links

 
 FOX Sports Australia Championship section
 Championship news from Planet Rugby
 Independent Rugby Championship news from SuperXV Rugby
 IRB welcomes Argentina Four Nations Invite, IRB.com, 14 September 2009

 
Argentina national rugby union team
Australia national rugby union team
New Zealand national rugby union team
South Africa national rugby union team
Recurring sporting events established in 1996
SANZAAR rugby union competitions
International rugby union competitions hosted by Australia
International rugby union competitions hosted by New Zealand
International rugby union competitions hosted by Argentina
Rugby union competitions for national teams
History of rugby union matches between New Zealand and South Africa
History of rugby union matches between Argentina and South Africa
History of rugby union matches between Argentina and Australia
History of rugby union matches between Argentina and New Zealand
History of rugby union matches between Australia and South Africa
History of rugby union matches between Australia and New Zealand